Alex Zahara  is a Canadian television, film and voice actor. Born in Grande Prairie, Alberta, he was involved with theatre while still in school, performing in a stage version of MASH. He later taught the "Acting for Teens" class at the Vancouver Film School. Zahara graduated with a BFA after studying at the universities of Alberta and British Columbia.

Select filmography

TV roles
Stargate SG-1 as Alien Leader & Alien #1, Eggar, Iron Shirt, Michael Webber, Shy One, Warrick (1998-2003)
The Sentinel as Gabe (1998)
Dead Man's Gun as Tommy (1998)
The Net as Marshall Roberts (1999)
The Outer Limits as Karl Rademacher (Episode, "Tribunal") (1999)
First Wave as Gregory (1999)
Los Luchadores as Douglas Slade (2000)
Andromeda as Hanno (2001)
The Immortal as Demon Assistant (2001)
Dark Angel as Johanssen (2001)
Jeremiah as Ezekiel (2002)
The Dead Zone as Major Reg Granowitz (2003)
Kingdom Hospital as Sol Tarus (2004)
Cold Squad as Steve Baker (2004)
Tru Calling as Peter (2004)
Young Blades as the Duke de Faure (2005)
Blood Ties as Magnus (2007)
Psych as Alan Zenuk (2010)
The Man in the High Castle as SS Officer Oliver Diels (2015-2018)

Movie roles
The 13th Warrior as Norseman (1999)
Kill Me Later as Officer Larry (2001)
Walking Shadow as Lou Montana (2001)
Babylon 5: The Legend of the Rangers as Dulann (2002)
Open Range as Chet (2003)
The Keeper as Derrick (2004)
Ogre as Lawrence (2008)
Another Cinderella Story as British director (2008)
Ice Twisters as Damon Jarwell (2009)
2012 as Mr. Anton (2009)
Horns as Dr. Renald (2013)
A Daughter's Nightmare as Dr. Shwarzstein (2014)
Aliens Stole My Body as Tar Gibbons (2020)
Drinkwater as Mr. Babcock (2021)

Voice acting
B-Daman Fireblast as Slot Stinger, Greg Day (2014)
Dead Rising 2 as Theodore "Ted" Smith (2010)
Dynasty Warriors: Gundam 3 as Lockon Stratos (2010)
Gintama° as Shinsuke Takasugi (2017)
Iron Man: Armored Adventures as Peter Corbeau (2009)
Lego Jurassic World: The Secret Exhibit as Vic Hoskins (2018)
Lego Jurassic World: Legend of Isla Nublar as Vic Hoskins (2019)
Mobile Suit Gundam 00 as Lockon Stratos
My Little Pony: Friendship Is Magic as Jack Pot (2018)
NANA as Mr. Mizuki (2006–2007)
ReBoot: The Guardian Code as Alpha Sentinel (2018)
Roswell Conspiracies as Nick Logan (1999-2000)
The Girl Who Leapt Through Time as Kousuke Tsuda (2006)
Future Boy Conan as Lepka (2021)

References

External links
 
 Official website

Living people
Canadian male film actors
Canadian male television actors
Canadian male voice actors
Male actors from Alberta
People from Grande Prairie
University of Alberta alumni
University of British Columbia alumni
Year of birth missing (living people)
20th-century Canadian male actors
21st-century Canadian male actors